The first USS Chinook (SP-644) was a United States Navy patrol vessel in commission from 1917 to 1918.

Chinook was built as a private motorboat of the same name. In 1917, the U.S. Navy acquired her from her owner for use as a section patrol boat during World War I. She was enrolled in the Naval Coast Defense Reserve on 19 October 1917 and commissioned as USS Chinook (SP-644) in 1917.

Chinook performed patrol duty on the Detroit River for four months and was returned to her owner in February 1918.

References
 
 Department of the Navy Naval History and Heritage Command Online Library of Selected Images: U.S. Navy Ships -- Listed by Hull Number: SP-644 Chinook at "SP" #s and "ID" #s -- World War I Era Patrol Vessels and other Acquired Ships and Craft numbered from SP-600 through SP-699
 NavSource Online: Section Patrol Craft Photo Archive Chinook (SP 644)

 

Patrol vessels of the United States Navy
World War I patrol vessels of the United States